The 2009 FIA WTCC Race of Mexico (formally the 2009 FIA WTCC HSBC Race of Mexico) was the second round of the 2009 World Touring Car Championship season. It was held on 22 March 2009 at the Autódromo Miguel E. Abed near Puebla, Mexico. It was the fourth running of the FIA WTCC Race of Mexico.

The two races were won by SEAT Sport's Rickard Rydell and Yvan Muller.

Background
After the first round of the year in Brazil, defending champion Yvan Muller was tied on points with SEAT Sport teammate Gabriele Tarquini at the top of the drivers' championship. Scuderia Proteam Motorsport's Félix Porteiro was leading the Yokohama Independents' Trophy.

Report

Testing and free practice
The test session on Friday saw joint championship leader Yvan Muller go fastest. BMW drivers Augusto Farfus and Andy Priaulx set the pace early on before SEAT drivers Rickard Rydell and Tarquini went quicker. With a minute before the end of the session, Muller set the fastest time. Porteiro was the fastest independent driver in sixth while none of the Chevrolet drivers got into the top ten with Nicola Larini the fastest of the trio in twelfth.

Rydell led the opening free practice session on Saturday morning, the first of a SEAT 1–2–3–4. Farfus was the fastest BMW in fifth and Larini was the fastest Chevrolet down in thirteenth. Robert Huff was unable to set a time due to an oil leak on his Chevrolet Cruze.

The second free practice session saw Rydell go quickest once again. The BMWs of Farfus and Jörg Müller were second and third ahead of the SEAT Sport pair of Yvan Muller and Tarquini. The final two factory SEATs were Tiago Monteiro and Jordi Gené were eighth and thirteenth respectively.

Qualifying
Augusto Farfus, Andy Priaulx and BMW pushed to the limit and interrupted SEAT’s
domination that lasted since the test session in Curitiba. Farfus won pole position, posting the fastest time of the session with a lap of 1:37.981, the first driver to break the 1:38 wall so far. He beat Priaulx by only 0.045 seconds, while Gabriele Tarquini saved SEAT’s honour claiming third position with a one-tenth gap. BMW and SEAT cars equally shared the ten positions giving access to Q2. Although they sat in the pits until halfway through the session, all five SEAT Sport drivers managed to make the top-ten, with Gabriele Tarquini in second with a gap of 0.065 seconds after having clocked a provisional fastest lap at 1:38.047.

Félix Porteiro topped the Independents again and also managed to advance to Q2 setting the 10th fastest lap at 1:38.972. Chevrolet and LADA drivers remained all out of Q2; Nicola Larini missed the top-ten by 18 thousandths of a second, while Jaap van Lagen’s session ended prematurely because of an engine leak. In Q2, Yvan Muller was the first to post a quick lap at 1:37.924, but the reigning world
champion was immediately ousted by Farfus with the time of 1:37.682. Jordi Gené, Félix Porteiro, Sergio Hernández and Andy Priaulx were the last to join the session. In the dying seconds Priaulx managed to jump into second with a lap of 1:37.727, a time which
resisted to Tarquini’s last attempt that was worth third place (1:37.793). Porteiro completed a lap of 1:38.525 that gave him a brilliant eighth position on the grid for Race 1.

Warm-Up
Pole sitter Farfus topped the times in Sunday morning's warm–up session, ahead of Priaulx and Rydell.

Race One
Rickard Rydell forced his way through the BMW front row to claim SEAT’s third consecutive
victory in three rounds. Augusto Farfus and Andy Priaulx put a lot of pressure on the Swedish driver and eventually settled in second and third respectively, the first podium results for BMW in the season so far. While SEAT and BMW men were fighting for the top positions, Nicola Larini managed to defend his eighth place, scoring the first point for the new Chevrolet Cruze. Félix Porteiro won the Independents’ class once again, recovering from the 14th position where he had fallen after being involved in a collision at the start.

Race Two
The second race was another SEAT vs BMW fight. The reigning world champion Yvan Muller claimed his second victory of the season as he managed to keep at bay the former world champion Andy Priaulx. Jordi Gené took the lead at the start, but then, in a breathtaking succession of overtaking manoeuvres, Jörg Müller, Tarquini, Yvan Muller, Priaulx, Rydell and Farfus overturned the order completely. Müller and Tarquini however, had to leave the company after they clashed on lap 6 and slipped down. All the three Chevrolet cars completed the race, with Larini’s in tenth position, and so did the LADA cars, with Jaap van Lagen’s in 17th. Porteiro claimed a fourth consecutive win in the Independents’ trophy.

Results

Qualifying

 — Kristian Poulsen had his qualifying times deleted after failing to stop at the weighing point after the session.

Race 1

Bold denotes Fastest lap.

Race 2

Bold denotes Fastest lap.

Standings after the event

Drivers' Championship standings

Yokohama Independents' Trophy standings

Manufacturers' Championship standings

 Note: Only the top five positions are included for both sets of drivers' standings.

References

External links
Results Booklet PDF at MST Systems

FIA WTCC Race of Mexico
Mexico